The Maja Valles are a large system of ancient outflow channels in the Lunae Palus quadrangle on Mars. Their location is 12.6° north latitude and 58.3° west longitude. The name is a Nepali word for "Mars". The Maja Valles begin at Juventae Chasma. Parts of the system have been partially buried by thin volcanic debris. The channels end at Chryse Planitia.

Huge outflow channels were found in many areas by the Viking Orbiters. They showed that floods of water broke through dams, carved deep valleys, eroded grooves into bedrock, and traveled thousands of kilometers.
The Maja Valles show evidence of lava flows in the northern section. Studies with HiRISE and CTX images suggest that the lava flows did not reach the turbulence necessary to erode large channels. So, the Maja Valles are believed to have been formed through water erosion.

See also

 Chaos terrain
 Geology of Mars
 HiRISE
 Juventae Chasma
 Lakes on Mars
 List of areas of chaos terrain on Mars
 Lunae Palus quadrangle
 Martian chaos terrain
 Outburst flood
 Outflow channels

References

Further reading

Valleys and canyons on Mars
Lunae Palus quadrangle